Alan Horn or Horne may refer to:

Alan F. Horn, chairman of Walt Disney Studios
Sir Alan Edgar Horne, 2nd Baronet (1889–1984) of the Horne Baronets
Sir Alan Gray Antony Horne, 3rd Baronet (b. 1948) of the Horne Baronets